The 1943 Miami Hurricanes football team represented the University of Miami as an independent during the 1943 college football season. The Hurricanes played their home games at Burdine Stadium in Miami, Florida. The team was coached by Eddie Dunn, in his first year as interim head coach, while active head coach Jack Harding served in World War II.

Schedule

References

Miami
Miami Hurricanes football seasons
Miami Hurricanes football